Papoose Peak Jumps was a ski jumping hill located at Palisades Tahoe in the US state of California. The hill consisted of three jumps, with K-points of 80, 60 and 40 meters, respectively. Constructed upon the hill-side of Little Papoose Peak, it was built for the 1960 Winter Olympics; the 80-meter hill hosted the ski jumping event and the 60-meter hill the Nordic combined event. The jump was designed by Heini Klopfer and opened in 1958. After the Olympics the venue saw little use; it was renovated for the 1976 US National Ski Jumping Championships, but has since fallen into disrepair and demolished to make room for the Far East Express ski lift.

History
As Squaw Valley was an undeveloped area when it was awarded the Olympics, the organizing committee was free to design a tailor-made Olympic resort. Heini Klopfer from Oberstdorf, West Germany, was hired to design the ski jumping hills, which he finished in early 1957. He chose to locate it on the hill-side of Little Papoose Peak, opposite Blyth Arena. He described the location as "the type of hill one always seeks but seldom finds". The construction contract was awarded to Diversified Builders, who constructed the jumps during the summer and fall of 1958.

Papoose Peak Jumps was the first Olympic ski jump to have three in-runs.   Minor details were corrected in 1959 and 1960. It was renovated ahead of the 1976 US National Championships. However, it fell out of use afterwards and instead the hill was converted to a speed skiing and snowboarding hill. Later the resort's Far East Express chairlift was installed on the hill.

Facilities
The hill consisted of three jumps with a common out-run, each with a construction point (K-point) of 80, 60 and 40 meters, respectively. It was located in the central area of the Olympic resort, next to the skating rinks and the Olympic Village. Tall trees on both sides of the hill gave good protection against the wind. The location was also ideal because of the sun was at the competitor's backs. A judges' tower was constructed on the side, which was both accessible by stairs from the bottom of the hill or from the chairlift which ran to the top of the in-runs. The largest jump had a take-off angle of 8.5 degrees and a landing angle of 38 degrees.

Events
The first competitive use of the hills was the trial Olympics in February 1959. During the 1960 Winter Olympics, the 80-meter hill was used for special jumping on 28 February, while the 60-meter hill was used for Nordic combined  on 22 February. He was followed up by Finland's Niilo Halonen and Austria's Otto Leodolter. In the ski jumping part of the Nordic combined event, Germany's Georg Thoma received the highest points ahead of the Soviet Union's Dmitriy Kochkin and Norway's Tormod Knutsen. The cross-country part of the event took place at McKinney Creek Stadium. While Thoma won the discipline overall, Knutsen finished second overall ahead of the Soviet Union's Nikolai Gusakov. In 1976, the US National Championships in Ski Jumping were held at the large hill, and was won by Jim Denney.

References
Bibliography
 

Notes

Ski jumping venues in the United States
Sports venues in Placer County, California
Defunct sports venues in California
Tourist attractions in Placer County, California
Venues of the 1960 Winter Olympics
Olympic Nordic combined venues
Olympic ski jumping venues
1958 establishments in California
Sports venues completed in 1958